Públia Hortênsia de Castro (1548–1595) was a scholar and humanist in the court of Catherine of Austria, Queen of Portugal.

Born in 1548 in Vila Viçosa, Portugal, she was named for Hortensia, the famous Roman orator and daughter of Quintus Hortensius, suggesting that her parents intended for her to become a well-educated woman. She evidently studied Greek and Latin, and by the time she was seventeen she was engaged in public debates on Aristotle. There are stories that, dressed as a boy and chaperoned by her brother, she attended the University of Coimbra, in Lisbon, but historians consider this unlikely. Nonetheless, she is known to have composed psalms in Latin, although they are now lost, and she was well enough admired by King Philip II that he granted her a pension for life.

She eventually left the court and joined an Augustine convent. She died in Évora in 1595.

Namesakes
In 1978, Lisbon honored de Castro by giving her name to a street in the area of Carnide.

References

1548 births
1595 deaths
People from Évora
People from Vila Viçosa
16th-century Portuguese writers
16th-century Portuguese women writers
Renaissance people
Renaissance women